Giambattista Isnardi de Castello (28 June 1651 – August 1732) was a Roman Catholic prelate who served as Bishop of Mondovi (1697–1732).

Biography
Giambattista Isnardi de Castello was born in Turin, Italy on 28 June 1651. He was ordained a deacon on 23 May 1677 and ordained a priest on 30 May 1677. On 26 August 1697, he was appointed during the papacy of Pope Innocent XII as Bishop of Mondovi. On 1 September 1697, he was consecrated bishop by Bandino Panciatici, Cardinal-Priest of San Pancrazio, with Prospero Bottini, Titular Archbishop of Myra, and Matteo Gagliani, Bishop of Fondi, serving as co-consecrators. He served as Bishop of Mondovi until his death in August 1732.

References

17th-century Italian Roman Catholic bishops
18th-century Italian Roman Catholic bishops
Bishops appointed by Pope Innocent XII
Bishops of Mondovì
1651 births
1732 deaths